Górki  is a village in the administrative district of Gmina Kwidzyn, within Kwidzyn County, Pomeranian Voivodeship, in northern Poland.

For the history of the region, see History of Pomerania.

The village has a population of 538.

Notable residents
 Ida Siekmann (1902–1961), first casualty of the Berlin Wall

References

External links
 Górki at Kwidzynopedia 

Villages in Kwidzyn County